This is a list of football stadiums in North Korea. The minimum capacity is 5,000.

External links 
 Democratic People's Republic of Korea - Stadiums
 World Stadiums - Stadiums in North Korea

References
 Satellite pictures of North Korean Stadiums

 
Football stadiums
North Korea
Football stadiums